GlassesUSA.com is an online retailer of prescription eyewear. It was founded in 2009.

History
GlassesUSA was founded in 2009 by Daniel Rothman, Eldad Rothman and Roy Yamner. Daniel Rothman is the current CEO of the company. The company primarily focuses on North America, but also accepts orders from 92 countries. Around 130,000 unique visitors visits the website daily. In 2015, GlassesUSA raised a $12.5 Million growth round led by the Viola Private Equity fund, a member of the Viola Group, a technology Private Equity group whose purpose is to "enable Israeli entrepreneurs."

Brands
GlassesUSA, through its affiliation with the Luxottica Group, offers a wide range of frames including:
 Ray-Ban
 Tom Ford
 DKNY
 DVF
 Prada
 Oakley
 Calvin Klein
 Michael Kors
 Persol

Partnerships
In 2015, GlassesUSA raised a $12.5 Million growth round led by the Viola Private Equity fund which is a member of the Viola Group, which "is a venture capital firm, empowering Israeli or Israeli-related early-stage tech startups to become global category leaders.

Recognition

 This business is not accredited by the BBB   
 Named as one of the top 500 online retailers in the U.S between 2011-2019 by ‘’Internet Retailer’’.
 Rated "Excellent" by Stella Service in 2015.

See also 
 Warby Parker

References

External links 
 

Retail companies established in 2009
Optics manufacturing companies
Eyewear retailers of the United States
Eyewear companies of the United States